Coyote Wells is an unincorporated community in Imperial County, California.

Coyote Wells Landing Fields
During World War II the US Navy built two airstrips at Coyote Wells to support NAS San Diego.
North Coyote Wells Naval Outlying Landing Field also called Booming Naval Outlying Landing Field was a 2,600 feet runway. North Coyote Wells Naval Outlying Landing Field was 13 miles northeast of Coyote Wells. Just north of the airstrip was a bombing target. Landing Field was used as an Emergency Landing Field. Site was abandoned in 1949. No trace of airstrips remains.(32.93, -115.88)
Soth Coyote Wells Naval Outlying Landing Field was 3 miles east of Coyote Wells built in 1938. The site had three 2,500 feet unpaved runways for Emergency Landing at an elevation of 300 feet. Site was sold in 1956. No trace of airstrips remains.(32.74, -115.96)

See also
California during World War II

References

Unincorporated communities in Imperial County, California
Unincorporated communities in California